Giovanni Battista Tolomei, S.J., (3 December 1653 – 19 January 1726) was an Italian Jesuit priest, theologian, and cardinal.

Life
Tolomei was born of noble parentage at the ancestral castle of the Counts of Capraia in the Grand Duchy of Tuscany, located between Pistoia and Florence.  At the age of fifteen, after an early schooling at Florence, he studied law at the University of Pisa. On 18 February 1673 he entered the Society of Jesus at Rome, and was ordained a priest in 1684. Although later made a cardinal, he was never raised to the rank of bishop.

Tolomei was master of eleven languages: Latin, Greek, Hebrew, Chaldean, Syriac, Arabic, English, French, Spanish, Illyrian, as well as his native Italian. He began his public career at Rome by expounding the Sacred Scriptures on Sunday evenings in the Church of the Gesù. 

At the age of thirty Tolomei was elected in the General Congregation of the Society as its Procurator General, an office he held for the next five years, relinquishing it to take the Chair of Philosophy at the Roman College (now the Gregorian University). Here his lecture room was thronged. His lectures were printed in Rome in 1696 under the title of Philosophia mentis et sensuum, and demonstrated that, while loyal to the principles and method of Aristotle, he welcomed every discovery of his time in the natural sciences and wove these into his course. The lectures were reprinted in 1698 in Germany and evoked praise from the noted philosopher, Gottfried Wilhelm Leibniz. 

Tolomei later filled the Chair of Theology at the Roman College and revived the courses in controversial dogma begun by St. Robert Bellarmine a century earlier. These lectures in manuscript form filled six volumes in folio but were never printed. Successively Rector of the Roman College and of the German College, he was at the same time Consultor to the Sacred Congregation of Rites, as well as of the Index, and of Indulgences, in addition to being one of the appointed examiners of bishops. 

On 17 May 1712, unexpectedly created a cardinal by Pope Clement XI, with the title of Santo Stefano al Monte Coelio, Tolomei became chief adviser to the pope in matters of theology, particularly in the preparation of the condemnation of the ideas of Pasquier Quesnel. As cardinal he assisted at the conclaves which elected Pope Innocent XIII and Pope Benedict XIII.

Tolomei died at Rome at the Roman College, and was buried before the high altar of the Jesuit Church of St. Ignatius there.

Works
His published works are the Philosophia mentis et sensuum (with the addition of natural theology and ethics, Rome, 1702), De primatu beati Petri (in the second series of the miscellany printed from the manuscripts in the library of the Roman College, Rome, 1867), and a little pamphlet containing Daily Prayers for a Happy Death (in Latin, Vienna, 1742; also in German, Augsburg, 1856).

References

External links
 Hugo von Hurter, Nomenclator literarius, IV (Innsbruck, 1910);
 Sommervogel, Bibliothèque de la compagnie de Jésus, VIII (Brussels, 1898);
 
 Biography

Giovanni Battista Tolomei in the Historical Archives of the Pontifical Gregorian University

1653 births
1726 deaths
People from the Province of Florence
17th-century Italian Jesuits
18th-century Italian Jesuits
Roman Catholic biblical scholars
18th-century Italian Roman Catholic theologians
Jesuit theologians
Academic staff of the Pontifical Gregorian University
18th-century Italian cardinals
Jesuit cardinals
Burials at Sant'Ignazio, Rome
17th-century Italian Roman Catholic theologians